Pareiorhaphis vestigipinnis is a species of catfish in the family Loricariidae. It is native to South America, where it occurs in the Canoas River basin in the state of Santa Catarina in Brazil. The species reaches 9.8 cm (3.9 inches) in standard length and is believed to be a facultative air-breather.

References 

Loricariidae
Fish described in 1992
Catfish of South America
Freshwater fish of Brazil